Elections to Liverpool City Council were held on Friday 1 November 1912.

18 of the 34 seats were uncontested.

After the election, the composition of the council was:

Election result

Ward results

* - Retiring Councillor seeking re-election

Comparisons are made with the 1909 election results, as the retiring councillors were elected in that year.

Abercromby

Aigburth

Anfield

Breckfield

Brunswick

Castle Street

Dingle

Edge Hill

Everton

Exchange

Fairfield

Garston

Granby

Great George

Kensington

Kirkdale

Low Hill

Netherfield

North Scotland

Old Swan

Prince's Park

Sandhills

St. Anne's

St. Domingo

St. Peter's

Sefton Park East

Sefton Park West

South Scotland

Vauxhall

Walton

Warbreck

Wavertree

Wavertree West

West Derby

Aldermanic Elections

Aldermanic Election 9 November 1912

Caused by the death of Alderman William Humphrey Williams (Conservative, elected as an alderman on 9 November 1910) on 11 August 1912. In his place Councillor John Lea (Liberal, Granby, elected 1 November 1911) was elected as an alderman by the councillors on 9 November 1912.

.

Aldermanic Election, 8 January 1913

Caused by the resignation of Alderman Edward Grindley (Conservative, last elected as an alderman on 9 November 1907).  In his place Councillor Frank John Leslie (Conservative, Breckfield, 
elected 1 November 1911) was elected as an alderman by the councillors on 8 January 1913

Aldermanic Election, 5 March 1913

Cause ?

Councillor Hartley Wilson (Conservative, Aigburth, elected 1 November 1911) was elected as an alderman by the councillors on 5 Mar 1913.

Aldermanic Election, 2 July 1913

Caused by the resignation of Alderman Andrew Commins (Irish Nationalist, elected 9 November 1910)
 which was reported to the Council on 4 June 1913
.

In his place Councillor George Jeremy Lynskey (Irish Nationalist, North Scotland, elected 1 November 1910)
 was elected as an alderman by the councillors on 2 July 1913.

Aldermanic Election 30 July 1913

Caused by the resignation of Alderman William Watson Rutherford MP (Conservative, elected 9 November 1907) was reported to the Council on 2 July 1913 In his place Councillor John Utting (Conservative, Kirkdale, elected 1 November 1912) was elected as an alderman by the Council on 30 July 1913.

Aldermanic Election 

Caused by the death of Alderman William Oulton (Conservative, elected 9 November 1907) 
 on 27 September 1913 which was reported to the Council on 1 October 1913

In his place

By-Elections

No. 22 Granby, 27 November 1912

Caused by the election to alderman of Councillor John Lea (Liberal, Granby, elected unopposed 1 November 1911) on 9 November 1912

No. 6 Breckfield, 29 January 1913

Caused by Councillor Frank John Leslie (Conservative, Breckfield, elected 1 November 1911) being elected as an alderman by the Council on 8 January 1913.

No. 3A Walton, 17 March 1913

Caused by the death of Councillor Sampson Gannon (Conservative, Walton, elected 1 November 1911)
 on 19 January 1913.

No. 21 Abercromby, 18 March 1913

Caused by the death of Councillor Thomas James Smith junr. (Conservative, Abercromby, elected 1 November 1910)

No. 29 Aigburth, 18 March 1913

Caused by Councillor Hartley Wilson (Conservative, Aigburth, elected 1 November 1911) 
being elected as an alderman by the Council on 5 March 1913.

The Term of Office to expire on 1 November 1914.

No. 31 Fazakerley, 19 March 1913

Caused by the resignation of Councillor Dr. Henry Herbert Clarke (Conservative, Fazakerley, elected 1 November 1911)
.

No. 5A Wavertree West, 8 April 1913

Caused by the resignation of Councillor Edmund Gerson Jackson (Conservative, Wavertree West, 
elected 1 November 1911)

No. 13 North Scotland, 15 July 1913

Caused by Councillor George Jeremy Lynskey (Irish Nationalist, North Scotland, elected 1 November 1910)
 
being elected as an alderman by the Council on 2 July 1913.

The Term of Office to expire on 1 November 1913

No. 2 Kirkdale, 14 October 1913

Caused by the election as an alderman of Councillor John Utting (Conservative, Kirkdale, elected 1 November 1912)
 on 30 July 1913.

No. 4 Fairfield, 14 October 1913

Caused by Councillor Francis L'Estrange Joseph (Liberal, Fairfield, elected 1 November 1912) ceasing to be a councillor.

See also

 Liverpool City Council
 Liverpool Town Council elections 1835 - 1879
 Liverpool City Council elections 1880–present
 Mayors and Lord Mayors of Liverpool 1207 to present
 History of local government in England

References

1912
1912 English local elections
1910s in Liverpool